Benyo is a surname. Notable people with the surname include:

 Richard Benyo (born 1946), American journalist and distance runner
 Yuriy Benyo (born 1974), Ukrainian footballer and manager

See also
 Benyon

Hungarian-language surnames